Henan Polytechnic University, formerly Jiaozuo Coal Mining School, is a mining university in Jiaozuo City of the Henan province, China. It was established in 1909 by the British Syndicate Co. Ltd. and is the oldest mining university in China.

History 
Henan Polytechnic University (HPU) is the first mining university in Chinese history, as well as the earliest higher education in the Henan province. Established by the British Syndicate Co. Ltd., in 1909, it has now developed into a multi-disciplinary coordinated development of teaching and research university which covered science, technology, management, arts, law, economics and education.

HPU is the A-level university of undergraduate teaching assessed by the National Ministry of Education and honored with one of key universities in Henan province. The university recruits students nationwide and overseas with the qualification of granting doctoral, master, bachelor.

In the history of the university, the great educator Cai Yuanpei, the famous geologist Weng Wen-hao, the mining mogul Sun Yue-qi served at the board of directors as executive director, honorary president and chairman. Zhang Zhong-lu, Zhang Qing-lian, Ding Guan-hai, Zhang Bo-sheng and many other overseas scholars, professors taught in university and served as leadership positions successively. Under their leadership, the university became well-known home and abroad.

During a century's period, HPU has formed its idea of running school “Educate People and Advocate Academic” and founded the spirit of “Learn Eagerly and Act Diligently”. The university has carried on its traditional thoughts of “Work Hard and Achieve Pragmatic Results, Love China and Love HPU”.

HPU devotes itself to promoting international academic exchanges and cooperation with institutions of higher education in foreign countries. Since the 1980s, it has established sisterhood relationship with 15 countries and more than 30 universities and research institutions in the USA, UK, France, Canada, Australia, Poland, Russia, Japan, Korea, etc. and had made great achievements in teachers exchange, students exchange, scientific research and academic cooperation.

Since its establishment, the university has cultivated more than 13 senior specialized personnel for the country. Most graduates become the backbone in their units with many becoming well-known experts, scholars, academicians and served at provincial, city and large enterprise leadership positions.

International students 
The dormitories for international students at the main campus are located in Jiaozuo city. There are approximately 500 international students studying at the HPU. Its international students are made up of students from most countries in the world including most of Ireland, Bangladesh, Pakistan, India, Indonesia, Nepal, Sri Lanka, South Korea, Laos, Mongolia, Thailand, the US and many African countries.

External links

Universities and colleges in Henan